Howard "Harry" Manson (January 21, 1885 – November 8, 1940) was a Canadian professional ice hockey player. Manson played professionally with Cornwall, Ontario, Galt, Ontario, Ottawa Victorias, Toronto Professional Hockey Club, Waterloo Colts, Port Hope Professionals and Montreal Wanderers.

Career
Born in Mille Roches, Ontario, Manson first played professionally for the local Cornwall Hockey Club in the Federal Amateur Hockey League in 1906–07. He played one further season with Cornwall, and subbed in a Stanley Cup challenge for the Ottawa Victorias. In 1908–09, Manson played one game with Cornwall, then joined the Guelph Royals, followed by the Toronto Pros after Guelph disbanded. In 1909–10, Manson started the season with the Waterloo Colts, before joining Galt for two regular season games and a Stanley Cup challenge. In 1910–11, Manson stayed with the Port Hope Professionals of the Eastern Ontario Professional Hockey League all season. Manson played one game for the Montreal Wanderers in the 1911–12 season to end his professional career.

Personal life
The 1911 Canadian census lists Manson's professions as "carpenter" and "hockey player".

References

1885 births
1940 deaths
Montreal Wanderers (NHA) players
Canadian ice hockey players